Auxon can mean:
 A type of large-scale self-replicating machine
 Auxon, Aube, a commune in France
 Auxon, Haute-Saône, a commune in France